Dennis C. "Denny" Wolff (born September 9, 1951) is an American farmer, non-profit founder, and former public official who was the 2018 Democratic nominee for U.S. Congress in Pennsylvania's (new) 9th Congressional District.

Wolff is a former Secretary of the Pennsylvania Department of Agriculture, where he served in the cabinet of Governor Edward G. Rendell.

On October 12, 2017, Wolff, a Columbia County dairy farmer, announced his candidacy for Congress.  After the Pennsylvania Supreme Court struck down the congressional map put in place in 2011, the Court crafted a new map to eliminate the gerrymandering of the previous version, and Columbia County was placed in the new 9th congressional district.  

Wolff is also the founder and president of The Nicholas Wolff Foundation, a non-profit which operates as Camp Victory.  Camp Victory is a summer camp for chronically ill children and their families.

Dairy Farmer 
Wolff is the owner of Pen-Col Farms, based in Millville, Pennsylvania.  He is a fifth-generation Pennsylvania dairy farmer and began his own farming operation in 1970.  Wolff started in a rented farm with thirty-five Holstein cows and grew into an operation which spanned several farms and included over 500 Holsteins.  From 1970 through the early 2000s, Pen-Col Farms operated a dairy store just outside of Millville that sold fresh milk and other dairy products.  The store was noted particularly for their chocolate milk.

In the 1980s, Wolff took Pen-Col Farms international and entered the world market for fresh and frozen bovine embryos.  The farm has since shipped to over 30 countries.  The Pen-Col herd has received international accolades for their impact on the global Holstein breed.  The farm has bred 456 cows rated Very Good or Excellent, 54 Gold Metal Dams, and 122 Dams of Merit.  Pen-Col emphasizes breeding for superior performance as measured by protein yield.

Wolff received a Master Farmer award in 1994 and was appointed by Governor Ed Rendell as Pennsylvania's Secretary of Agriculture in 2003.

Camp Victory: "A Special Camp For Special Kids" 
Wolff is the president and chairman of the board of directors of Camp Victory, a 501(c)(3) non-profit organization.  The camp is "A Special Camp for Special Kids."  In 1984, Wolff's youngest son, Nicholas, was born with biliary atresia, an extremely rare liver disease.  Nicholas spent the first two years of his life in and out of hospitals until receiving a life-saving liver transplant in 1986 at the University of Minnesota.

Once Nicholas returned home after his 1986 transplant, "the Wolff family, realizing the value of having a place to share their triumps and struggles, shared a dream to found a camp for chronically ill children."  Wolff donated the initial 35 acres of land to start the camp.  Through partnerships and an outpouring of community support, Camp Victory began construction.  In 1994, the camp hosted in first campers, when five groups brought 325 campers.  Since this time, Camp Victory's hosted over 30,000 overnight guests and counselors.

Camp Victory consists of 14 guest cabins, a dining hall, and a medical shed to address special health needs of campers, among other buildings.  Campers can utilize a nature center, fishing pond, zip line, arts & crafts building, chapel, sports pavilion, archery area, outdoor stage, baseball field, swimming pool, volleyball court, basketball court, game pavilion, wetlands preserve, climbing wall, and wheelchair-accessible tree house during their time at the camp.

Secretary of Agriculture 
Newly sworn-in Governor Ed Rendell appointed Wolff to be his Secretary of Agriculture, a cabinet-level appointment, in January 2003.  He was confirmed by the Pennsylvania State Senate later that year. Wolff played a leading role in the annual Pennsylvania Farm Show, held at the Pennsylvania Farm Show Complex and Expo Center, the largest indoor agricultural exhibit in the United States.  In 2014, the agriculture sector contributed over $8.1 billion to Pennsylvania's economy.  In 2016, one out of every seven jobs in the state were related to agriculture and 7.72 million acres of land in the state were used for agricultural purposes.

During his time leading the Pennsylvania Department of Agriculture, Wolff implemented several key programs intended to promote the agriculture industry.  He founded the Center for Dairy Excellence, which  "was created to develop and support programs for both the Center for Dairy Excellence and other Pennsylvania dairy organizations which educate, cultivate, and inspire a thriving and sustainable Pennsylvania dairy industry."

Wolff implemented the "PA Preferred" program, a branding program to promote Pennsylvania products, which can be found at more than 4,000 locations throughout the Commonwealth.  The program allows consumers to choose local agricultural products.  After Wolff stepped down from his role as Secretary in 2009, Governor Tom Corbett signed state House Bill 1424 in 2011, making PA Preferred the permanent branding program of agricultural commodities produced in Pennsylvania.  Governor Corbett stated that "Buying PA Preferred products helps support farmers and local businesses that work to produce quality products, while making investments in local economies and keeping Pennsylvania growing. PA Preferred makes a difference."  

He also implemented the "Blueprint to End Hunger," an initiative that brings together local, state, and federal government entities to engage the issue of hunger and food insecurity.

Wolff also founded the "PA Grows" program, which helps agribusinesses in Pennsylvania obtain low-rate financing necessary to begin, continue or expand their operations.

Wolff resigned in 2009 and was succeeded by Russell Redding.

Campaign for Congress 
On October 12, 2017, Wolff announced his candidacy for Congress. Wolff's campaign slogan was simple: "Send a Farmer."

In his announcement, Wolff stated that "When I look at the United States Congress, I don’t see many people that have lived the same kind of life that I have, the same kind of life my neighbors have.”  Drawing attention as a qualified candidate and moderate rural Democrat running in a district drawn to favor a Republican, PoliticsPA in October 2017 added this race to their list of vulnerable districts in the 2018 election cycle, noting that "party officials are high on Dennis Wolff, a dairy farmer and former state secretary of agriculture." The Democratic Congressional Campaign Committee in November 2017 placed the district on their "battleground" lists for the 2018 election cycle.

Wolff is a Blue Dog Democrat, a coalition of moderate and conservative Democrats, often from rural areas. Wolff was formally endorsed by the Blue Dogs on February 8, 2018.  Wolff was only one of two Congressional candidates endorsed by the Blue Dogs in Pennsylvania during the 2018 election cycle, the other being Conor Lamb.  Another prominent Blue Dog from Pennsylvania is former Congressman Tim Holden, a Schuylkill County resident.

After the Pennsylvania Supreme Court struck down the 2011 congressional map on January 22, 2018, the Court put in place a redrawn "remedial" congressional map on February 19, 2018.  Wolff indicated that regardless of other factors, he would run in whichever district his home in Columbia County was placed in.  Columbia County was subsequently placed into the new 9th Congressional district, which includes all of Carbon, Columbia, Montour, Schuylkill and Lebanon counties.  It's also includes parts of Berks, Luzerne and Northumberland counties.  The new 9th district was rated as having a Partisan Voting Index (PVI) of R+14, among the most conservative congressional districts in the country.  The additional Republican registration advantage between the old 11th district and the new 9th district were significant, and the remedial map gave the 9th district Republican nominee a seemingly insurmountable advantage in the general election.      

On May 15, 2018, Wolff won the Democratic primary for the 9th Congressional District, taking in 41% of the vote, compared to Gary Wegman's 31% and Laura Quick's 28%.  Wolff won every county in the district except Wegman and Quick's home counties.

Although not a resident of the new 9th congressional district, candidate Dan Meuser won the Republican nomination the same evening.  Meuser, born in Long Island, New York and a resident of Dallas, Pennsylvania, lives in Pennsylvania's 8th congressional district. The 8th District is significantly more balanced district in terms of voter registration, with a Partisan Voting Index (PVI) rating of R+1 (versus R+14 in the 9th district) and had an incumbent Democratic congressman, Matt Cartwright.  Cartwright has strong name I.D. and financial backing.  It was heavily speculated that Meuser chose to run in the 9th district instead of his own district because winning an election in his own district would have been significantly more challenging.  Meuser, in August 2018, purchased a condominium in the 9th district for $210,000 to alleviate criticism that he does not live in the 9th district.  It is unknown if Meuser actually moved himself and his family from their nearby house into the condominium.  Meuser, who also unsuccessfully ran for Congress in 2008, was plagued then by criticism when he also sought elected office in a district that he did not live in.   

Wolff received several endorsements during his campaign, particularly from the agricultural and labor sectors.  Wolff received the support of agricultural equipment manufacturer John Deere and the National Farmers Union.  “It’s an exceptional thing for the [National Farmers Union] PAC to make a primary endorsement, but Denny Wolff is an exceptional candidate," said National Farmers Union President Roger Johnson.  Wolff also received multiple blue-collar labor endorsements, including the SEIU PA State Council, PA AFL–CIO, International Association of Sheet Metal, Air, Rail and Transportation Workers (SMART), and the United Association of Plumbers and Pipefitters.  In addition to his prior endorsement by the Blue Dogs, he was also endorsed by the Pennsylvania State Education Association, the largest group of educators in Pennsylvania.  

Wolff's policy platform emphasized:

 Reducing the cost of healthcare, prescription drugs, and addressing the opioid epidemic that has crippled the district
 Helping Pennsylvania's farmers struggling under record low milk, beef, soybean, etc. market prices
 Promoting vocational and technical training education, an affordable education that provides good-paying, local jobs
 Working in a strongly bipartisan manner to deliver results that are in the best interests of the 9th district, regardless of politics or party
 Promoting technological advancements to further fuel the district's economy, such as rural broadband and precision agriculture
 Giving Pennsylvania's small businesses an environment in which they can thrive and grow

The contest heated up in October, when Wolff claimed Meuser told him privately to "go to hell" at a debate in Berks County.  Meuser's campaign denied the allegation, stating that Wolff's claim was "completely insane" and "completely made up," apparently unaware that video evidence of the interaction existed.  Later, Meuser would concede and confess to making the comment.  

Meuser would go on to spend roughly 150% of Wolff's spending in the race, an unprecedented amount for a Republican in a R+14 district.   The majority of Meuser's ads were negative and attacked Wolff, which included digitally manipulated pictures of Wolff and Rep. Nancy Pelosi as football teammates, or holding hands, claiming they were "on the same team."  Wolff in multiple television ads and interviews debunked Meuser's attack, stating publicly that he supported new leadership and would not back Nancy Pelosi.  Meuser's campaign continued to campaign on that unsubstantiated claim and significantly outspent Wolff in advertising to push that message.   Wolff and Pelosi have never met.  

Meuser also spent significant financial resources in an attempt to frame Wolff as an "extreme liberal," despite Wolff's endorsement by the Blue Dog Democrats, financially conservative views, and support for Second Amendment rights.  Meuser, to shock of Republicans and contrary to his campaign messaging, was unable to secure the endorsement of the National Rifle Association.  

Wolff hit Meuser for acquiring his fortunate by abusing the Medicare system.  Meuser's motorized wheelchair manufacturing company, Pride Mobility, was the target of an investigation by the United States Office of the Inspector General which found that Pride Mobility had illegally partaken in massive Medicare abuse. They were fined $80,000 for this abuse and required to meet proscribed government standards to stop their illegal practices.  

Not a single newspaper in the 9th District would endorse Dan Meuser for Congress, despite the significant Republican voter registration advantage.  This was widely seen as a rebuke to Meuser's notoriously short temper, vicious campaign tactics, and Wolff running a final television ad calling for civility in politics.  During this ad, Wolff called Meuser out for his "go to hell" remark.  Wolff received the endorsement two local newspapers and the agricultural newspaper Farmshine.  The Sunbury Daily Item endorsed Wolff with the headline "Denny Wolff: A Different Kind of Democrat."  The Sunbury Daily Item cited Wolff's moderate views, experience, and emphasis on bipartisanship in their endorsement decision.  The paper said Meuser gave them absolutely no indication he cared to work across the aisle for the betterment of the 9th district.  

The general election was held on November 6, 2018.  Meuser topped Wolff with 59.7% of the vote, compared to Wolff's 40.3%.  Wolff successfully appealed to a broad cross section of the electorate, roughly cutting in half President Trump's 34%+ 2016 margin of victory just two years earlier in the deeply Republican district.  

Wolff has since returned to farming in Columbia County and remains president and chairman of the board of directors of Camp Victory, "A special camp for special kids."

Board Positions 
Wolff has served on/as:
 The Agricultural Technical Committee of the World Trade Organization
The Board of Directors at American Farmland Trust
The Board of Trustees at Penn State University
 The Board of Overseers at the University of Pennsylvania
 The Board of Directors at Agway Insurance Company
 The Pennsylvania Gaming Control Board
 President of the Northeast Association of State Department of Agriculture
President and Chairman of the Board of Camp Victory
State Committee of the USDA's Farm Service Agency

Awards 
Wolff's Awards:
 Honorary Doctorate, Delaware Valley College
 Holstein Association USA's Distinguished Leadership Award
Pennsylvania Farm Bureau's Distinguished Service Award, 2010
National Agribusiness Technology Center's Best Available Technology Award, 2009
Pennsylvania Farm Bureau's Barnraiser Award, 2009
Future Farmers of America's (FFA) Blue & Gold Award
Pennsylvania Veterinary Medical Association's Presidents Award, 2008
 Founders Award, Pennsylvania Association of Township Supervisors, 2008
 Leadership Central Penn Award, 2007
Pennsylvania Landscape & Nursery Association's Friend of Horticulture Award, 2006
Small Business Development Center's Partnership and Economic Development Award, 2006
National Association of Agricultural Educator's Outstanding Cooperation Award, 2004
 Master Farmer Award, 1994

References

1951 births
Living people
Pennsylvania Democrats
State cabinet secretaries of Pennsylvania
Candidates in the 2018 United States elections
Dairy farmers